The Sinuiju Stadium (신의주경기장), also known as October Stadium (10월 경기장), is a multi-purpose stadium in Sinŭiju, North Korea, that is mainly used for events and football matches of the Amrokkang Sports Club. Built in 1965, it has a capacity of 17,500 spectators.

See also 
 List of football stadiums in North Korea

References 

Football venues in North Korea
Sports venues in North Korea
Multi-purpose stadiums in North Korea
Sports venues completed in 1965
1965 establishments in North Korea
Buildings and structures in North Pyongan Province